A Big She-Bear (The story of mountains with a prologue and an epilogue) is a 2013 Georgian novel by author Miho Mosulishvili.

Logline
A little boy – Vache – is afraid that the village governor (administrative head) Ahab and his team might kill a big she-bear, as the latter is a symbol of the sin committed by the villagers: Ahab promised to marry Vache’s mother Lela and deceived her. The woman, abandoned and criticized by the villagers, committed suicide.

Outline
The inhabitants of a village located in the mountains of South Caucasus struggle with a big She-Bear. The bear has caused damage to the villagers' corn fields, beehives and cattle, killed hunters and their dogs and avoided all kinds of traps. The village governor (administrative head), called a Biblical name Ahab, tries to kill the big she-bear with the help of the villagers. All the inhabitants of the village realize that this bear is a ghost from Ahab's past life.

Release details
 2013 — Saunje Publishing

Film adaptation 
June 26, 2015 Miho Mosulishvili as a screenwriter is winner with CPU Lira Production (Producer and Film-director Lali Kiknavelidze) for project ‘A Big She-Bear’ in the competition "Adaptation of the 21st Century Georgian Literary Work" organized of the Ministry of Culture and Monument Protection of Georgia, Georgian National Film Center and Georgian National Book Center, The Jury Members: Nana Jorjadze, Levan Berdzenishvili, Levan Tutberidze, Davit Chubinishvili, Vazha Gigashvili, Manana Anasashvili, Lela Ochiauri, Davit Gabunia

References

External links

 A BIG SHE BEAR 
 A BIG SHE-BEAR
 Didi zu datvi 

Literature of Georgia (country)
2013 novels
21st-century Georgian novels
Georgian magic realism novels
Works by Miho Mosulishvili